Felix Smetana (1907 – 1968) was a German art director. He designed the sets for many Austrian and German films during the postwar era.

Selected filmography
 Wedding in the Hay (1951)
 Voices of Spring (1952)
 The Immortal Vagabond (1953)
 Lavender (1953)
 The Bird Seller (1953)
 The Sun of St. Moritz (1954)
 Espionage (1955)
 The Beggar Student (1956)
 Scandal in Bad Ischl (1957)
 Almenrausch and Edelweiss (1957)
 The Street (1958)
 Girls for the Mambo-Bar (1959)
 Beloved Augustin (1960)
 Our Crazy Aunts (1961)

References

Bibliography
 Fritsche, Maria. Homemade Men in Postwar Austrian Cinema: Nationhood, Genre and Masculinity. Berghahn Books, 2013.

External links

1907 births
1968 deaths
German art directors
Film people from Dresden